Beyanlu or Bayanlu or Bianlu or Bayanloo or Biyanlu may refer to:
 Bayanlu, Kurdistan
 Bianlu, West Azerbaijan
 Beyanlu, Zanjan